Bentornato papà is a 2021 Italian drama directed by Domenico Fortunato.

Plot 
After attending an important job interview in Rome, Franco comes back home with his son Andrea, who lives in the Capital trying to become a successful musician. In Puglia, where they live, his wife Anna and his daughter Alessandra wait for him. Sadly, just after getting the prestigious role he applied for, Franco has a stroke: such a tragic event disrupts Franco's and his family's lives, but it becomes a moment of personal growth at the same time.

Production 
The movie was shot in Puglia (Martina Franca, Taranto, Porto Cesareo) and Rome.

Release 
A preview of the movie was presented on 29 September 2021 at the Bari International Film Festival in Bari. The movie was then released in cinemas on 7 October 2021 and televised for the first time on Rai 1 on 2 March 2022.

References